Pacific Fair is a major shopping centre in Broadbeach Waters on the Gold Coast, Queensland, Australia. It is Queensland's second-largest shopping centre and the fifth-largest nationally.

Pacific Fair was developed by Hooker Retail Developments and opened in 1977 on what was swampland with 96 specialty stores and two anchor tenants. When built, it surpassed the now-demolished Sundale Shopping Centre in Southport as the Gold Coast's largest shopping mall. 

Pacific Fair's original 17ha site featured a themed, outdoor design, including mock-Tudor buildings and European thoroughfares, Asian villages with ponds, and a French Quarter. In 1992, a four-level Myer store opened in the Arcade. Since then, Pacific Fair has undergone numerous expansions and has grown to have more than 400 specialty stores and four anchor tenants. In January 2014, work began on a major redevelopment project to meet the predicted regional growth on the Gold Coast.

Prior to the redevelopment, the shopping centre had four main major stores including a four-level Myer, Kmart, Target, Coles and formerly Toys "R" Us. Daimaru operated in the centre before its Australian withdrawal, albeit briefly. It also had a 12-screen Birch Carroll and Coyle Cinema (re-opened as Event Cinemas in late 2015).

Pacific Fair is a major public transport interchange on the Gold Coast, serviced by Surfside Buslines, and the Broadbeach South G:Link station located not far from the shopping centre. Nearby is The Star Gold Coast and Gold Coast Convention & Exhibition Centre. Pacific Fair fronts Little Tallebudgera Creek and is the southern end of the Surfers Riverwalk.

This shopping centre was featured on the third season of The Mole.

Redevelopment
Work commenced in January 2014 on redeveloping and re-branding Pacific Fair. The well-known pink turreted structures and lotus flower logos were modernised. The development, costing $670 million, added 120 new specialty stores including a David Jones store spanning two levels and covering , an enlarged and relocated Target, a relocated Coles and new Woolworths and Big W. Much of the central outdoor alameda was demolished and replaced with an indoor complex. David Jones is located on the previous site of Toys 'R' Us, 'The Resort' leisure section occupies the previous site of Coles, and the new Coles, Woolworths and food court in the southwest corner of the campus are situated on the site of the previous cinemas. Louis Vuitton marks what was formerly a Warner Bros Studio Store.

The expansion contains a leisure and entertainment precinct and increased the number of specialty stores to more than 400. In November 2014, the first stage of the re-development was completed with the re-opening of the north-east mall, with a new and enlarged Target, and a new JB Hi Fi Home store. A section of the new south-west mall opened in June 2015, introducing an enlarged Coles Supermarket and a number of specialty stores. More of the new south-west mall opened in August 2015, bringing in a new Woolworths Supermarket, new Big W, Fresh Food Market and more than 40 specialty stores. In November 2015, Event Cinemas reopened with three Gold Class cinemas and one VMax theatre and in late November, Pacific Fair opened The Patio, a casual dining precinct. In May 2016 the 'Resort Area' opened along with an extended mall section bringing in a range a two-level David Jones and a number of international brands such as H&M and Uniqlo.

Transport 

Pacific Fair is located in Broadbeach on Hooker Boulevard and the Gold Coast Highway. Pacific Fair Bus Station has bus connections to Robina, Nerang and SeaWorld/Main Beach.

Broadbeach South Station on the G:link light rail line is a short walk from Pacific Fair and provides tram and bus connections. Buses departing from Broadbeach South travel to Nerang, Tweed Heads, Robina, Main Beach and the Gold Coast University Hospital. Trams departing the station travel north to the Gold Coast University Hospital via Surfers Paradise, Main Beach and Southport.

All bus services are provided by Surfside Buslines and tram services by G:link under contract to Qld Transport's Translink.

Gallery

See also

List of shopping centres in Australia

References

External links 
Pacific Fair

Shopping centres on the Gold Coast, Queensland
Shopping malls established in 1977
1977 establishments in Australia
Broadbeach, Queensland